Takae Itō (born January 13, 1968, in Hyogo Prefecture, Japan) is a Japanese politician who has served as a member of the House of Councillors of Japan since 2016. She represents the Hyogo at-large district and is a member of the Komeito party.

References 

Living people
1968 births
People from Hyōgo Prefecture
Members of the House of Councillors (Japan)
Komeito politicians
21st-century Japanese politicians
21st-century Japanese women politicians